Wildwood is a city in St. Louis County, Missouri, United States. It is located in the far western portion of the county. As of the 2020 census, the population was 35,417. Wildwood is the home of the Al Foster Trail, and numerous other trails, parks, and reserves such as Rockwoods Reservation and Babler State Park.

Geography
Wildwood is located at  (38.581653, -90.649427).

Wildwood is bounded to the north by Chesterfield; on the east by Clarkson Valley and Ellisville; to the south by Eureka and Pacific; and on the west by Franklin County.

Demographics

2020 census
As of the 2020 census, there were 35,417 people and 12,438 households living in the city. The racial makeup of the city was 85.6% White (84.8% non-Hispanic White), 1.6% African American, 0.1% Native American, 6.0% Asian, 0.7% from other races, and 5.9% from two or more races. Hispanic or Latino of any race were 3.3%.

2010 census
At the 2010 census there were 35,517 people, 12,112 households, and 10,153 families living in the city. The racial makeup of the city was 87.2% White, 6.7% African American, 0.2% Native American, 4.0% Asian, 0.4% from other races, and 1.5% from two or more races. Hispanic or Latino of any race were 2.3%.

Of the 12,112 households 45.4% had children under the age of 18 living with them, 75.2% were married couples living together, 6.0% had a female householder with no husband present, 2.6% had a male householder with no wife present, and 16.2% were non-families. 13.6% of households were one person and 5% were one person aged 65 or older. The average household size was 2.93 and the average family size was 3.24.

The median age was 41.5 years. 30.3% of residents were under the age of 18; 5.9% were between the ages of 18 and 24; 20.3% were from 25 to 44; 34.8% were from 45 to 64; and 8.9% were 65 or older. The gender makeup of the city was 49.5% male and 50.5% female.

2000 census
At the 2000 census there were 32,884 people, 10,837 households, and 9,243 families living in the city. The estimated median house/condo value in 2005 was $345,100. The racial makeup of the city was 94.74% White, 1.62% African American, 0.12% Native American, 2.38% Asian, 0.01% Pacific Islander, 0.29% from other races, and 0.83% from two or more races. Hispanic or Latino of any race were 1.38%.

Of the 10,837 households 51.0% had children under the age of 18 living with them, 79.0% were married couples living together, 4.6% had a female householder with no husband present, and 14.7% were non-families. 12.4% of households were one person and 4.0% were one person aged 65 or older. The average household size was 3.02 and the average family size was 3.32.

The age distribution was 33.2% under the age of 18, 4.8% from 18 to 24, 31.4% from 25 to 44, 25.1% from 45 to 64, and 5.5% 65 or older. The median age was 36 years. For every 100 females, there were 97.0 males. For every 100 females age 18 and over, there were 94.1 males.

Estimated median household income in 2007: $113,270. Males had a median income of $75,849 versus $41,224 for females. The per capita income for the city was $38,485. About 1.6% of families and 2.2% of the population were below the poverty line, including 2.1% of those under age 18 and 5.4% of those age 65 or over.

Education
Wildwood is served by Rockwood School District, with one high school within the city limits, Lafayette High School.

St. Louis Community College–Wildwood is a local, two-year public community college located off routes 100 and 109.

Police
The City of Wildwood contracts for police service with the St. Louis County Police Department.

Culture

The Big Chief Restaurant is all that remains of a tourist complex that opened on U.S. Route 66 in 1928. It was added to the National Register of Historic Places listings in 2003.

Notable people
 Albert Pujols of the St. Louis Cardinals lived in Wildwood briefly during a previous stint with the team.
 David Freese, former third baseman for the St. Louis Cardinals, grew up in Wildwood.
 Ryan Howard, former first baseman for the Philadelphia Phillies, grew up in Wildwood.
 Kelly Stables, actress, grew up in Wildwood
 Luke Voit, current designated hitter and first baseman for the Washington Nationals, grew up in Wildwood.

References

External links
 City of Wildwood
 Wildwood Historical Society of Wildwood, Missouri

Cities in St. Louis County, Missouri
Missouri populated places on the Missouri River
Cities in Missouri